Halgerda gunnessi is a species of sea slug, a dorid nudibranch, a shell-less marine gastropod mollusk in the family Discodorididae.

Distribution
This species was described from Western Australia.

References

Discodorididae
Gastropods described in 2001